Travon Levar Bryant (born February 5, 1983), nicknamed T,  is an American professional basketball coach and former player. He played college basketball for the University of Missouri.

Amateur career
Bryant attended David Starr Jordan High School in Long Beach, California where he was coached by Ron Massey Sr. He was a McDonald's High School All-American who played his college basketball under coach Quin Snyder with the Missouri Tigers at the University of Missouri from 2000 to 2004. Bryant contributed to Missouri's success as a role player in his four years there. Bryant made four three-pointers against the University of Illinois's Fighting Illini in the Mizzou-Illini rivalry game in St. Louis in his senior year.

College statistics

|-
| style="text-align:left;"| 2000–01
| style="text-align:left;"| Missouri
|24  || 0 ||  ||.485  ||.000 || .281 ||3.5 || 0.4 ||0.3  || 0.6 || 3.0
|-
| style="text-align:left;"| 2001–02
| style="text-align:left;"| Missouri
| 36 ||25  ||18.6  ||.576  || .462 ||.510 ||5.4  || 0.8 ||0.6  || 0.8 || 6.3
|-
| style="text-align:left;"| 2002–03
| style="text-align:left;"| Missouri
| 33 ||26  ||25.7  || .479 || .360 || .561||5.85  ||1.09  || 0.85 || 1.24 || 8.91
|-
| style="text-align:left;"| 2003–04
| style="text-align:left;"| Missouri
| 30 ||29  ||26.2  || .515 || .407 || .718|| 6.57 ||1.70  || 0.70 || 1.50 || 10.57
|-
|- class="sortbottom"
! style="text-align:center;" colspan=2|  Career 

!123 ||81 || 23.3||.514  || .393 ||.559  || 5.4 ||1.0  || 0.7 ||1.0  || 8.80
|-

NCAA Awards & Honors
All-Big 12 Honorable Mention – 2004

Coaching career
In November 2015, Bryant joined the Oklahoma City Blue as an assistant coach. In June 2017, he joined Brooklyn Nets as an assistant coach working with player development.

Career statistics

Regular season 

|-
| align="left" | 2004–05
| align="left" | Iraklis
|  25||  ||24.8  ||.467  ||.286  ||.560  ||6.4 || 1.1 || 0.7 || 0.6 ||10.2
|-
| align="left" | 2005–06
| align="left" | Rodou
|  24||  ||31.4  ||.508  ||.419  ||.554  ||7.4 || 1.3 || 1.1 || 1.1 ||14.5
|-
| align="left" | 2005–06
| align="left" | Treviso
|  16|| 2 ||10.9  ||.453  ||.556  ||.588  ||2.56 || 0.56 || 0.50 || 0.19 ||4.56
|-
| align="left" | 2006–07
| align="left" | Frankfurt
|  28|| 28 ||29.3  ||.511  ||.286  ||.617  ||7.75 || 1.79 || 1.07 || 0.79 ||14.71
|-
| align="left" | 2007–08
| align="left" | Maroussi
|  22||  ||23.7  ||.576  ||.346  ||.522  ||5.1 || 1.0 || 0.9 || 0.4 ||10.3
|-
| align="left" | 2008–09
| align="left" | AEK
|  23||  ||27.3  ||.457  ||.245  ||.711  ||6.8 || 1.2 || 0.8 || 0.8 ||11.6
|-
| align="left" | 2009–10
| align="left" | Panionios
|  21||  ||25.7  ||.535  ||.423  ||.667  ||7.0 || 1.1 || 1.1 || 0.5 ||9.9
|-
| align="left" | 2010–11
| align="left" | Pau
|  21|| 16 ||26.0  ||.509  ||.222  ||.607  ||5.38 || 1.95 || 0.86 || 0.33 ||9.48
|-
| align="left" | 2011–12
| align="left" | Kyiv/Le Mans
|  40|| 5 ||13.9  ||.541  ||.312  ||.745  ||3.08 || 0.70 || 0.45 || 0.28 ||5.40
|-
| align="left" | 2012–13
| align="left" |Cholet
|  36|| 17 ||20.2  ||.520  ||.333  ||.811  ||4.06 || 1.11 || 1.08 || 0.25 ||9.50
|-
| align="left" | 2013–14
| align="left" |Oldenburg
|  8|| 5 ||12.2  ||.345  ||.500  ||.667  ||1.38 || 0.88|| 0.50 || 0.00 ||4.62
|-
| align="left" | 2014–15
| align="left" |Concordia
|  11|| 9 ||24.8  ||.437  ||.000  ||.610  ||8.00 || 1.09|| 0.45 || 0.82 ||9.18
|-
| align="left" | 2014–15
| align="left" | Akita
|  18||  ||19.7  ||.444  ||.250  ||.500  || 6.5 || 1.6 || 0.5 || 1.1 ||6.2
|-

Playoffs 

|-
|style="text-align:left;"|2005–06
|style="text-align:left;"|Treviso
| 13 ||  || 10.7 || .472 || .500 || .571 || 1.9 || 0.4 || 0.5 || 0.2 || 4.1
|-
|style="text-align:left;"|2007–08
|style="text-align:left;"|Marousi
| 13 ||  || 21.7 || .607 || .625 || .625 || 4.9 || 1.2 || 0.8 || 0.6 || 7.2
|-
|style="text-align:left;"|2009–10
|style="text-align:left;"|Panionios
| 2 ||  || 23.0 || .583 || .500 || .500 || 5.5 || 1.0 || 0.5 || 0.0 || 9.0
|-
|style="text-align:left;"|2011–12
|style="text-align:left;"|Le Mans
| 7 ||  || 11.4 || .571 || .800 || .667 || 2.0 || 0.7 || 0.3 || 0.1 || 6.3
|-

References

External links
Oklahoma City Blue Basketball Operations
Draftexpress.com Profile
Euroleague.net Profile
French League Profile 
Missouri Tigers Profile

1983 births
Living people
AEK B.C. players
Akita Northern Happinets players
American expatriate basketball people in Argentina
American expatriate basketball people in Canada
American expatriate basketball people in France
American expatriate basketball people in Germany
American expatriate basketball people in Greece
American expatriate basketball people in Italy
American expatriate basketball people in Japan
American expatriate basketball people in Ukraine
American men's basketball players
Aris B.C. players
Basketball coaches from California
Basketball players from Long Beach, California
BC Budivelnyk players
Brooklyn Nets assistant coaches
Cholet Basket players
Élan Béarnais players
Estudiantes Concordia basketball players
EWE Baskets Oldenburg players
Greek Basket League players
Iraklis Thessaloniki B.C. players
Kolossos Rodou B.C. players
Le Mans Sarthe Basket players
Maroussi B.C. players
McDonald's High School All-Americans
Missouri Tigers men's basketball players
Oklahoma City Blue coaches
Pallacanestro Treviso players
Parade High School All-Americans (boys' basketball)
Panionios B.C. players
People from Cerritos, California
Power forwards (basketball)
Skyliners Frankfurt players
Sportspeople from Long Beach, California